Srby is a municipality and village in Domažlice District in the Plzeň Region of the Czech Republic. It has about 500 inhabitants.

Administrative parts
Villages of Medná, Polžice, Roudná and Vítání are administrative parts of Srby.

References

Villages in Domažlice District